Ayúdeme usted compadre is a 1968 Chilean musical film directed by Germán Becker. It was entered into the 6th Moscow International Film Festival.

Cast
 Los Perlas as Themselves
 Los Huasos Quincheros as Themselves
 Los Gatos as Themselves
 Pedro Messone as himself
 Fresia Soto as herself
 Gloria Simonetti
 Sérgio Livingstone as himself
 Mario Kreutzberger

References

External links
 

1968 films
1968 musical films
Chilean documentary films
1960s Spanish-language films